Gwinnett County is located in the north central portion of the U.S. state of Georgia. It forms part of the Atlanta metropolitan area. In 2020, the population was 957,062, making it the second-most populous county in Georgia (after Fulton County). Its county seat is Lawrenceville.  The county is named for Button Gwinnett, one of the signatories of the Declaration of Independence.

Gwinnett County is included in the Atlanta-Sandy Springs-Roswell, GA Metropolitan Statistical Area. It is located about 10 miles northeast of Atlanta's city limits.

History
In 1813, Fort Daniel was created during the War of 1812 in territory that would become Gwinnett County. The county was created in 1818 by an act of the Georgia General Assembly, Gwinnett County was formed from parts of Jackson County  (formerly part of Franklin County) and from lands gained through the cession of Creek Indian lands. Named for Button Gwinnett, one of the signatories of the Declaration of Independence, the first county election was held at the home of Elisha Winn, and the first Superior Court was held in his barn. The county seat was later placed at Lawrenceville.

In 1831, a group of white men were tried and found guilty in Lawrenceville for violating Georgia law by living in the Cherokee Nation without a valid passport from the Governor. Two of the men appealed to the US Supreme Court in Worcester v. Georgia, which resulted in a ruling stating that only the federal government had jurisdiction over native lands, a decision which still stands.

In 1861, all three of Gwinnett County's representatives at the Georgia Constitutional Convention (1861) in Milledgeville voted against secession. Towards the end of the war, Union troops foraged in Gwinnett County as part of the Atlanta Campaign.
The Freedmen's Bureau was active in Gwinnett County during Reconstruction. In 1871 the courthouse in Lawrenceville was burned by the Ku Klux Klan in an attempt to avoid prosecution for their crimes, which included the shooting of a black election manager in Norcross.

Early in the county's history, gold mining was a minor industry. The Gwinnett Manufacturing Company, a cotton textile factory, operated in Lawrenceville in the 1850s through 1865, when it burned. The Bona Allen Company in Buford, Georgia produced saddles, harnesses and other leather goods from 1873 to 1981.

The northeastern part of Gwinnett County was removed in 1914 to form a part of the new Barrow County.

Geography

The county is located in the upper Piedmont region of the state.

It is located along the Eastern Continental Divide. A portion of the county to the northwest is a part of the Chattahoochee River National Recreation Area chain.

Allocation of water from the regional reservoir, Lake Lanier, at the extreme north of the county, has been subject to the Tri-state water dispute.

The southern and central portions of Gwinnett County are located in the Upper Ocmulgee River sub-basin of the Altamaha River basin. Most of the county's northern edge, from south of Peachtree Corners to north of Buford, is located in the Upper Chattahoochee River sub-basin of the ACF River Basin (Apalachicola-Chattahoochee-Flint River Basin). The county's eastern edge, north and south of Dacula, is located in the Upper Oconee River sub-basin of the same Altamaha River basin.

Adjacent counties

 Forsyth County – north
 Hall County – northeast
 Jackson County – northeast
 Barrow County – east
 Walton County – southeast
 Rockdale County – south
 DeKalb County – southwest
 Fulton County – west

Transportation

Airport
The county maintains a regional airport under the name Gwinnett County Airport, formerly Briscoe Field. The closest major airport serving the region is Hartsfield–Jackson Atlanta International Airport.

Major roads and expressways

  Interstate 85
  Interstate 985
  U.S. Route 23
  U.S. Route 29
  U.S. Route 78
  State Route 8
  State Route 10
  State Route 13
  State Route 20
  State Route 84
  State Route 120
  State Route 124
  State Route 140
  State Route 141
  State Route 264
  State Route 316
  State Route 317
  State Route 324
  State Route 347
  State Route 365
  State Route 378
  State Route 403 (unsigned designation for I-85)
  State Route 419 (unsigned designation for I-985)

Transit systems
 GRTA Xpress commuter buses and Gwinnett County Transit serve the county.
 Norcross Greyhound Bus Terminal,  2105 Norcross Pkwy, Norcross, GA 30071
 On April 12, 2018, Gwinnett County Officials updated the transit plans to connect to the rest of Metro Atlanta via heavy rail.

Pedestrians and cycling

 Beaver Ruin Creek Greenway (Proposed)
 Camp Creek Greenway
 Cedar Creek Trail Loop
 Harbins Greenway (Proposed)
 Ivy Creek Greenway (Under construction)
 Ivy Creek-Snellville Trail (Proposed)
 Norcross-Lilburn Trail (Proposed)
 Piedmont Pathway (Proposed)
 Sugar Hill Greenway (Under construction)
 Suwanee Creek Greenway (Under construction)
 The Loop Trail (Proposed)
 Western Gwinnett Bikeway (Under construction)

In 2016, Suwanee unveiled the first Bike Share program in Gwinnett County.

Demographics

Gwinnett County is often cited as one of the counties in the US that has demographically changed the most rapidly. As recently as 1990, over 90% of Gwinnett County's population was white. By 2007, the county was considered majority-minority.

2020 census

As of the 2020 United States census, there were 957,062 people, 301,471 households, and 230,960 families residing in the county.

2010 Census

As of the 2010 United States Census, there were 805,321 people, 268,519 households, and 203,238 families residing in the county. The racial makeup of the county was 53.3% White (44.0% Non-Hispanic White), 23.6% black or African American, 10.6% Asian, 0.5% American Indian, 0.1% Pacific Islander, 8.8% from other races, 3.1% from two or more races. Those of Hispanic or Latino origin made up 20.1% of the population. In terms of ancestry, 8.3% were German, 7.8% were Irish, 7.7% were English, and 5.8% were American.

Of the 268,519 households, 45.6% had children under the age of 18 living with them, 56.2% were married couples living together, 14.2% had a female householder with no husband present, 24.3% were non-families, and 19.1% of all households were made up of individuals. The average household size was 2.98 and the average family size was 3.40. The median age was 33.7 years.

The median income for a household in the county was $63,219 and the median income for a family was $70,767. Males had a median income of $48,671 versus $39,540 for females. The per capita income for the county was $26,901. About 8.7% of families and 11.0% of the population were below the poverty line, including 15.1% of those under age 18 and 8.1% of those age 65 or over.

Economy
 AGCO is headquartered in Duluth.
 American Megatrends is headquartered in unincorporated Gwinnett County near Norcross.
 ASHRAE's world headquarters is in Peachtree Corners.
 Comcast Corporation, the American global telecommunications conglomerate and owner of Xfinity and NBCUniversal, has its Southeast Headquarters in Peachtree Corners.
 Canon has its southeast region headquarters in Norcross.
 Datapath, Inc., a firm specializing in secure satellite communications and wireless communications systems, is headquartered in unincorporated Gwinnett, near Duluth.
 Fortune 500 companies CarMax and Mass Mutual as well as Honeywell, Sprint Corporation, Siemens Industry Automation, Fleetcor, ACI Worldwide, and CMD Group are among the businesses in Peachtree Corners.
 Hapag-Lloyd’s North American Headquarters is in Peachtree Corners.
 The Harlem Globetrotters are headquartered in Peachtree Corners.
 Primerica is headquartered in unincorporated Gwinnett County, near Duluth.
 Scientific Atlanta in Lawrenceville.
 United States Tennis Association (USTA)‘s headquarters for the Southern Section is in Peachtree Corners.
 Waffle House is headquartered in unincorporated Gwinnett County, near Norcross.
 Yerkes National Primate Research Center, the CDC's primate research center located on the campus of Emory University in Atlanta, maintains its high security Yerkes Field Station, which houses most of its primates, near Lawrenceville.

Government and politics
Under Georgia's "home rule" provision, county governments have free rein to legislate on all matters within the county, provided that such legislation does not conflict with state or federal law, or state or federal Constitutions.

Gwinnett County, Georgia is governed by a five-member Board of Commissioners, which exercises both legislative and executive authority within the county.  The chairman of the board is elected county-wide and serves full-time. The four other commissioners are elected from single-member districts and serve part-time positions. The board hires a county administrator who oversees daily operations of the county's twelve executive departments. Gwinnett County has a police department that operates under the authority of the Board of Commissioners. Some of the local Gwinnett city budgets have recently come under increasing scrutiny of the General Funds allocated to police services. Cities such as Duluth have allocated as much as forty percent of their city budgets, reaching some of the highest levels in the nation. Solutions to high spending being discussed include additional “investment in mental health, housing, youth development and living wages would stabilize communities and prove more effective than policing.”

In addition to the Board of Commissioners, county residents also elect persons to the following positions: Sheriff, District Attorney, Probate Court Judge, Clerk of State/Superior Court, Tax Commissioner, State Court Solicitor, Chief Magistrate Judge (who appoints other Magistrate Court judges), Chief Superior Court Judge and Superior Court Judges, and Chief State Court Judge and State Court Judges.

Gwinnett County has the largest public school system in the state of Georgia. Members of the Board of Education are elected from special election districts in the county.

For most of the time from 1964 to 2012, the county was a Republican stronghold in presidential elections. The only Democrat to carry the county in this period was former Georgia governor Jimmy Carter in 1976, who carried Gwinnett during his sweep of every county in the state. However, the Republican edge narrowed, and then eventually was eliminated, in the 2010s as the county, as well as the rest of the Atlanta metro, have gotten larger and more diverse. In 2016, Hillary Clinton became the first Democrat to win Gwinnett County in 40 years and the first non-Georgian Democrat to do so since John F. Kennedy in 1960, doing so by 5.9 points. In 2018, Stacey Abrams became the first Democrat to win Gwinnett County in a gubernatorial election since 1986 when Joe Frank Harris swept every county statewide. The Democratic trend became even more apparent in 2020, when Joe Biden won the county by 18.2 points, the best showing for a non-Georgian Democrat since Kennedy's 73.50%.

Raphael Warnock earned 62.8% of the vote here in the 2022 Senate runoff election, the best showing for any Democrat in this county since the aforementioned John F. Kennedy result, beating the aforementioned Joe Biden result.

Gwinnett County is one of six "reverse pivot counties", counties that voted Republican in 2008 and 2012, and voted Democratic in 2016, 2018, and 2020.

Gwinnett County Board of Commissioners

United States Congress

Georgia General Assembly

Georgia State Senate

Georgia House of Representatives

Hospitals 
 Northside Hospital – Lawrenceville
 Northside Hospital – Duluth
 Piedmont Hospital Eastside, formerly an HCA hospital, purchased by Piedmont in 2020.

Media
The county's main newspaper is the Gwinnett Daily Post.

The Spanish language newspaper El Nuevo Georgia has its headquarters in unincorporated Gwinnett County, near Norcross.

Telemundo Atlanta and The Atlanta Journal-Constitution are both based out of Gwinnett.

Education

Primary and secondary schools
Gwinnett County Public Schools operates the public schools for residents in Gwinnett County, with the exception of residents inside the Buford city limits, which are served by the Buford City School District. There are 143 schools in the district—21 high schools, 29 middle schools, 80 elementary schools and 13 specialty schools, making it the largest school district in Georgia.

Private education

 Greater Atlanta Christian School, the second-largest independent school in Georgia, is located in Norcross.
 Hebron Christian Academy is located in Dacula.
 Providence Christian Academy is located in Lilburn
 Seigakuin Atlanta International School, a private Japanese education system elementary and middle school, was located in Peachtree Corners. The school moved from property at Oglethorpe University to its current address, former property of the Romanian First Baptist Church, in 2003.
 Wesleyan School is located in Peachtree Corners.

Colleges and universities
 Georgia Gwinnett College is located in Lawrenceville.
 Gwinnett Technical College is also located in Lawrenceville.
 Philadelphia College of Osteopathic Medicine is located in Suwanee.
 Trevecca Nazarene University has an adult education site in Duluth.
 University of Georgia has a satellite campus in Lawrenceville.

Sports
Minor-league affiliates of the NHL Boston Bruins and the MLB Atlanta Braves play home games and talent scout in the area.

In 2016, the Georgia Swarm of the National Lacrosse League relocated from Minnesota and began playing games at Infinite Energy Arena. The team won the league championship in 2017.

Georgia Force of Arena Football League had also played at Arena at Gwinnett Center before the team folded in 2012.

Gwinnett also hosts the Gwinnett Lions Rugby Football Club, a Division 3 Men's Rugby Team competing in the Georgia Rugby Union.

Communities

Cities

 Auburn (partly in Barrow County)
 Berkeley Lake
 Buford (partly in Hall County)
 Dacula
 Duluth
 Grayson
 Lawrenceville
 Lilburn
 Loganville (partly in Walton County)
 Norcross
 Peachtree Corners
 Snellville
 Sugar Hill
 Suwanee

Towns
 Braselton (partly in Jackson County, Hall County, and Barrow County)
 Rest Haven (partly in Hall County)

Census-designated places
 Mountain Park

Unincorporated communities
 Allendale
 Centerville
 Five Forks
 Mechanicsville
 Mountain Park
 Rockbridge
 Rosebud
 Tucker

Notable people

David Andrews, NFL football player with the New England Patriots.
Alvin Kamara, NFL running back with the New Orleans Saints.
Maya Moore, Women's Basketball Player with the Minnesota Lynx.
 Elijah Bryant (born 1995), basketball player in the Israeli Basketball Premier League
 Sam Flint (1882 – 1980), actor.
Chandler Massey, actor (Days of Our Lives); received the 2012, 2013, and 2014 Daytime Emmy Award for Outstanding Younger Actor in a Drama Series. In 2012, Massey became the first actor ever to receive a Daytime Emmy Award for playing a gay character.
James Ramsey, Major League Baseball player with the Los Angeles Dodgers.
Trey Thompkins, basketball player formerly with Los Angeles Clippers.
Brice Butler, NFL wide receiver with the Dallas Cowboys.
Jodie Meeks, NBA shooting guard with the Washington Wizards.
 Rittz, musician.
 Migos, hip hop group.

See also

 National Register of Historic Places listings in Gwinnett County, GA
 Larry Flynt shooting and Barbara Mackle kidnapping
List of counties in Georgia

References

External links

 Official website of Gwinnett County Government
 Gwinnett County Parks and Recreation
 Gwinnett County historical marker

 
Georgia (U.S. state) counties
1818 establishments in Georgia (U.S. state)
Populated places established in 1818
Gwinnet
Counties of Appalachia
Majority-minority counties in Georgia